Edward Holland (12 February 1806 – 5 January 1875) was a British Liberal Party politician from Worcestershire.

He was elected at the 1835 general election as a Member of Parliament (MP) Member of Parliament for East Worcestershire, but was defeated at the 1837 election.
He returned to the House of Commons after an 18-year absence when he was elected at a by-election in July 1855 as an MP for the borough of Evesham. He held that seat until he stood down at the 1868 general election, when the borough's representation was reduced to one seat.

He lived in the Vale of Evesham and ran a model farm at Dumbleton in Gloucestershire. He was at various points a president of the Royal Agricultural Society, a High Sheriff of Worcestershire and a deputy lieutenant of Gloucestershire.

References

External links 
 

1806 births
1875 deaths
Liberal Party (UK) MPs for English constituencies
UK MPs 1835–1837
UK MPs 1852–1857
UK MPs 1857–1859
UK MPs 1859–1865
UK MPs 1865–1868
High Sheriffs of Worcestershire
Deputy Lieutenants of Gloucestershire